The Hong Kong women's national U-17 football team is the female representative  football team for Hong Kong in the age of under-17 women's competitions. The team plays AFC U-17 Women's Asian Cup. The nation yet to qualified in the FIFA U-17 Women's World Cup.

Team image

Nicknames
The Hong Kong women's national under-17 football team has been known or nicknamed as "The Strength"

Home stadium
Hong Kong plays their home matches on the Queen Elizabeth Stadium and others stadiums.

History
The Hong Kong women's national under-17 football team have played their debut game on 16 April 2005 at Namhae, South Korea versus Japan which the team lost by 0–22 goals. The team have once played in the AFC U-17 Women's Asian Cup in 2005 and they exist from group stage. They nation has not qualified into the FIFA Women's U-17 World Cup.

Current squad 
The following squad was announced for the 2019 AFC U-16 Women's Championship qualification.

Fixtures and results 
Legend

2018

2023

Competitive records
 Champions   Runners-up   Third place   Fourth place

FIFA U-17 Women's World Cup

*Draws include knockout matches decided on penalty kicks.

AFC U-17 Women's Asian Cup 

*Draws include knockout matches decided on penalty kicks.

AFC U-17 Women's Asian Cup qualification 

*Draws include knockout matches decided on penalty kicks.

References

Asian women's national association football teams
nat
W